The Roberts Case ( or ) is a 1933 German drama film directed by Erich Engels and starring Hermann Speelmans, Camilla Spira and Eduard von Winterstein. It was shot at the Johannisthal Studios in Berlin.

Cast

References

Bibliography

External links 
 

1933 films
1933 drama films
Films of Nazi Germany
Films of the Weimar Republic
German drama films
1930s German-language films
Films directed by Erich Engels
German black-and-white films
1930s German films
Films shot at Johannisthal Studios